Michel van der Aa (born 10 March 1970) is a Dutch composer of contemporary classical music.

Early years 
Michel van der Aa was born 10 March 1970 in Oss. He trained as a recording engineer at the Royal Conservatory of The Hague, and studied composition with Diderik Wagenaar, Gilius van Bergeijk and Louis Andriessen.

Career 
The music of van der Aa has been performed by ensembles and orchestras internationally. Those include the AskoSchönberg ensemble, Freiburger Barockorchester, Ensemble Modern, Royal Concertgebouw Orchestra, Melbourne Symphony Orchestra, Dutch National Opera, Mozarteum Orchestra Salzburg, Seattle Chamber Players, Ensemble Nomad Tokyo, musikFabrik, Continuum Ensemble Toronto, Southwest German Radio Symphony Orchestra, Netherlands Radio Orchestras, Norrköping Symphony Orchestra, Sweden, and the Helsinki Avanti! Chamber Orchestra.

He completed a short program in film directing at the New York Film Academy in 2002. He also participated in the Lincoln Center Theater Director's Lab, a short, intensive course in stage direction in 2007.

Michel van der Aa's music theatre works, including the chamber opera One (2002), the opera  (2006, Amsterdam) and the music theatre work The Book of Disquiet, have received international critical praise. The innovative aspect of these operas is their use of film images and sampled soundtracks as an essential element of the score.

He directed the television production of One for the Dutch national broadcasting company NPS. Passage (2004), a short film by van der Aa, has been shown at several international festivals and has been aired on Dutch national television.

He has been a featured artist at the Perth Tura New Music Festival and Holland Festival. He has collaborated with choreographers such as Kazuko Hirabayashi, Philippe Blanchard, Ben Wright and Annabelle Lopez Ochoa.

Awards 
Van der Aa was recipient of the Gaudeamus International Composers Award in 1999. He also received the prestigious Matthijs Vermeulen Award for One in 2004. He received the Siemens Composers' Prize in 2005. He also received the Charlotte Köhler Prize for his directing work and the interdisciplinary character of his oeuvre in the same year. He was awarded the Hindemith Prize of the Schleswig-Holstein Musik Festival in 2006.

In November 2012 it was announced that van der Aa would be the recipient of the 2013 University of Louisville Grawemeyer Award in Music Composition, for his cello concerto Up-Close, a 'highly innovative fusion of musical and visual art' written for Sol Gabetta and the Amsterdam Sinfonietta. In 2013 he won the Mauricio Kagel Music Prize.

Projects 
Van der Aa's 3D film-opera Sunken Garden, a collaboration with David Mitchell, author of Cloud Atlas, was a joint commission from English National Opera, Barbican Centre, Toronto Luminato Festival, Opéra National de Lyon, and the Holland Festival. It was given its première by English National Opera conducted by André de Ridder at the Barbican Centre, London, on 12 April 2013, with Roderick Williams in the role of Toby.

His music is recorded on the Harmonia Mundi, Col Legno, Composers' Voice, BVHaast, and VPRO Eigenwijs labels, as well as his own label Disquiet Media.

Works

Opera and music theatre 

 Vuur (2001), opera, for solo voice, actors, singers, ensemble and soundtrack
 One (2002), chamber opera, for soprano, soundtrack and film
 libretto by the composer
  (2005–06), opera, for six solo voices, ensemble, soundtrack and film
 libretto by the composer, after Hirokazu Kore-Eda
 The Book of Disquiet (2008), music theatre, for actor, ensemble, soundtrack and film
 libretto after Fernando Pessoa, adapted by the composer
 Sunken Garden (2011–12), opera, for three singers, ensemble, soundtrack and film 
 libretto by David Mitchell
Blank Out (2015–16), chamber opera, for soprano, baritone (film), choir (film) and 3D film
Eight (2018–19), virtual reality installation, for mezzo-soprano, soprano, choir, soundtrack, VR
Upload (2021, Bregenzer Festspiele), music and libretto by van der Aa, for soprano, baritone, small orchestra, film projection, motion capture

Orchestra 

 See-Through (2000), for orchestra
 Here [to be found] (2001), for soprano, chamber orchestra and soundtrack
 Here [enclosed] (2003), for chamber orchestra and soundtrack
 Second Self (2004), for orchestra and soundtrack
 Imprint (2005), for Baroque orchestra
 Spaces of Blank (2007), song-cycle for mezzo-soprano, orchestra and soundtrack
 Violin Concerto (2014) for violin and orchestra

Ensemble 

 Span (1996), for ensemble and soundtrack
 Between (1997), for percussion quartet and soundtrack
 Above (1999), for ensemble and soundtrack
 Attach (1999–2000), for ensemble and soundtrack
 Here [in circles] (2002), for soprano (with small cassette player) and ensemble
 Mask (2006), for ensemble and soundtrack
 Up-Close (2010), concerto for solo cello, strings ensemble/orchestra, soundtrack and film

Chamber music 

 Auburn (1994), for guitar (classical or electric) and soundtrack
 Oog (1995), for cello and soundtrack
 Double (1997), for violin and piano
 Quadrivial (1997), for flute, violin, cello and prepared piano
 Solo (1997), for percussion solo
 Wake (1997), for percussion duo
 Caprce (1999), for violin solo
 Just Before (1999), for piano and soundtrack
 Memo (2003), for violin and portable cassette recorder
 Transit (2009), for piano and film
 Rekindle (2009), for flute and soundtrack
 And how are we today? (2012), for mezzo-soprano, piano and double bass
 Miles Away (2012), for mezzo-soprano, violin, piano and double bass

Dance and film 

 now [in fragments] (1995), for soprano, clarinet, cello and soundtrack
 ballet, commissioned by the Richard Alston Dance Company in collaboration with Ben Wright
 Staring at the Space (1995–96), for chamber orchestra
 70 minute theatre/dance work, commissioned by the Norrköping Symphony Orchestra and the Östgöta Dance Company
 Faust (1998), for ensemble and soundtrack
 a large-scale (90 minute) dance work, commissioned by the New National Theatre Tokyo, choreographed by Kazuko Hirabayashi
 The New Math(s) (2000), for soprano, traverso, marimba, violin and soundtrack
 Co-commissioned score with Louis Andriessen for a short film directed by Hal Hartley, for the BBC and NPS
 Solitaire (2003), for violin and soundtrack
 ballet, commissioned by the Het Nationaal Ballet, Den Bosch

Other 
 Writing to Vermeer (1999), opera by Louis Andriessen and Peter Greenaway, with the thirteen electronic music inserts (which accompany a corresponding film projection) composed by van der Aa.
 The Book of Sand (2015), digital interactive song cycle, based on Jorge Luis Borges' short story "The Book of Sand", with Kate Miller-Heidke
 Time Falling (2020), album in collaboration with Kate Miller-Heidke

References

External links 
 
 Facebook
 Profile, Intermusica
 Profile and works, Boosey & Hawkes
 

1970 births
20th-century classical composers
21st-century classical composers
Dutch classical composers
Dutch male classical composers
Dutch opera composers
Gaudeamus Composition Competition prize-winners
Living people
Male opera composers
New York Film Academy alumni
People from Oss
Pupils of Louis Andriessen
Royal Conservatory of The Hague alumni
Ernst von Siemens Composers' Prize winners
20th-century Dutch male musicians
21st-century male musicians